Lisala Airport  is an airport serving the Congo River city of Lisala, the capital of the Mongala District in the Mongala Province of the Democratic Republic of the Congo. The runway is on the northwestern side of the city.

Facilities 

Airlines and destinations

References

External links
OpenStreetMap - Lisala
 
FallingRain - Lisala Airport

Airports in Mongala